Adi Quala is a market town in southern (Debub) part of Eritrea. It is located 32 km south of Mendefera nearly 25 km from the Ethiopian border, over 2,000m above sea level.

Overview
Adi Quala is known for its tukul (hut) church St Marry church with its frescoes and its mausoleum for the Italian Army soldiers who died at the Battle of Adwa and Gundet. The ossuary, on which the italian flag flies, preserves the remains of three thousand six hundred forty-three fallen soldier from the first African campaign. The granite obelisk, which dominates the war memorial, bears the inscription: "La Patria ai caduti di Adua 1° Marzo 1896".
The town has a population of more than 30.000 people. The language that is spoken in the town of Adi Quala is Tigrinya. The population is pre-dominantly more than 99% Tigrinya.

Religion
Adi Quala's population are 60% Orthodox Christian and 40% are Muslims. There are some Roman Catholics and Protestants about 1% of the total population. There are two Orthodox churches, one Roman Catholic church and one mosque.

Writing in the 1890s, Augustus B. Wylde described the market in Adi Quala, held on Mondays, as medium in size.

Climate

References

Southern Region (Eritrea)
Populated places in Eritrea